Mindapennu is a 1970 Indian Malayalam film,  directed by K. S. Sethumadhavan and produced by V. M. Sreenivasan. The film stars Prem Nazir, Sheela, Sharada and Sukumari in the lead roles. The film had musical score by G. Devarajan.

Cast

Prem Nazir as Chandran
Sheela as Kamalam
Sharada as Kunjulakshmi
Sukumari as Pankajakshi
Adoor Bhasi
T. R. Omana as Dakshayani
Bahadoor as Unnikrishnan
Bhanji
G. K. Pillai as Chandran's Father
Paravoor Bharathan as Kunjappan
Premji as Chandran's Ammaavan
Vanchiyoor Radha

Soundtrack
The music was composed by G. Devarajan and the lyrics were written by Yusufali Kechery.

References

External links
 

1970 films
1970s Malayalam-language films
Films directed by K. S. Sethumadhavan